Harpalus disimuciulus is a species of ground beetle in the subfamily Harpalinae. It was described by Huang, Lei, Yan & Hu in 1996.

References

disimuciulus
Beetles described in 1996